The Man Who Sold Himself may refer to:
 The Man Who Sold Himself (album), a 2012 album by Gavin Harrison and 05Ric
 The Man Who Sold Himself (1925 film), a German silent film
 The Man Who Sold Himself (1959 film), a West German crime film